"Get Down" is the second single released from Craig Mack's debut album, Project: Funk da World.

Background
"Get Down" was released as the follow-up to his platinum-selling single "Flava in Ya Ear", which peaked at 9 on the Billboard Hot 100. While it did not match the success of "Flava in Ya Ear", "Get Down" nevertheless became a top 40 hit on the Hot 100, peaking at No. 38 on the chart. The song was produced by Easy Mo Bee, with an additional remix that was produced by Q-Tip, who also provided a guest verse. "Get Down" was certified gold by the Recording Industry Association of America for sales of 500,000 copies on April 5, 1995.

The music video was directed by Hype Williams.

Track listing
"Get Down" (Club Mix) – 3:50  
"Flava in Ya Ear" (featuring Busta Rhymes, LL Cool J, The Notorious B.I.G. and Rampage) (Remix) – 5:02
"Get Down" (radio edit) – 3:57  
"Get Down" (instrumental) – 3:53

Charts

Weekly charts

Year-end charts

Certifications

References

1994 singles
Bad Boy Records singles
Craig Mack songs
Song recordings produced by Easy Mo Bee
Music videos directed by Hype Williams
1994 songs